The Atlantic Collegiate Athletic Association (ACAA) is the governing body for collegiate sports in Atlantic Canada.  Founded in 1967 as the Nova Scotia College Conference, the ACAA is represented by ten schools in New Brunswick, Nova Scotia and Prince Edward Island competing in seven sports.

The ACAA is a member of the Canadian Collegiate Athletic Association, and conference champions compete for national collegiate titles.

Schools
 Crandall University Chargers in Moncton, NB
 Holland College Hurricanes in Charlottetown, PE
 Mount Allison University Mounties in Sackville, NB
 Mount Saint Vincent University Mystics in Halifax, NS
 Nova Scotia Agricultural College Rams in Truro, NS
 St. Thomas University Tommies in Fredericton, NB
 University of King's College Blue Devils in Halifax, NS
 UNB Saint John Seawolves in Saint John, NB
 Dragons de l'Université Sainte-Anne in Pointe-de-l'Église, NS
 UNB Fredericton Reds in Fredericton, NB (as affiliate member for Women's Rugby)

Sports
Badminton
Basketball 
Cross Country
Golf
Rugby
Soccer
Volleyball

ACAA Staff
Executive Director and Chair: Ron O'Flaherty
Marketing and Communications Coordinator: Brett Lewis

ACAA Executive Committee
President: Albert Roche, Holland College
VP Eligibility: Andrew Harding, Dalhousie Agricultural Campus
VP Finance: June Lumsden, Mount Saint Vincent University
VP SAFA: Michael Eagles, St. Thomas University
VP Marketing: Neil Hooper, University of King's College
VP Equity, Diversity, Inclusion: Jacques Bellefleur, Mount Allison University 
CCAA Director: Neil Hooper, University of King's College

ACAA Sport Convenors
Golf: Albert Roche, Holland College
Women's Rugby: Michael Eagles, St. Thomas University
Soccer: Jim Druart, Crandall University
Cross-Country Running: Andrew Dobson, Holland College
Badminton: Andrew Harding, Dalhousie Agricultural Campus
Volleyball: Eric Moffatt, St. Thomas University
Basketball: Natasha Kelly, UNB Saint John

See also
Canadian Collegiate Athletic Association

References

External links
 Atlantic Collegiate Athletic Association
 Canadian Collegiate Athletic Association

1967 establishments in Canada
Sports organizations established in 1967
Sports governing bodies in Canada
College sports governing bodies in Canada
Student sports governing bodies
University and college sports in Canada
College and university associations and consortia in Canada
College athletics conferences in Canada